Dharchula is a town in Pithoragarh district in the northern state of Uttarakhand, India, situated at an elevation of 940 m above sea level, surrounded by peaks from all sides and Kali river cutting through the middle, dividing the area into two towns on either bank of the river - one in India and the other in Nepal. River Kali originates from Kalapani and forms the border between India and Nepal. People of the two towns have similar traditions, culture, and lifestyle, and can move across the border without a passport or visa. The area has a mixture of Kumaouni and Rung language, traditions and culture. They move freely across the river as Indians and Nepalis do not need passport or visa to cross the soft border.

Dharchula gets its name from ‘Darchyo’ and ‘la’; Darchyo is a white coloured traditional holy flag and la is an honorific term in Runglwo. It is situated in a valley, on the banks of the Kali River. The name of the town originates from the Runglwo words for Darchyo (White colored Holy Flag erected outside every house of local community traditionally) and la (an honorific term in local language) because earlier only the darchyo / white flags were visible when seen from far away.

Demographics 
As of 2011, the population of Dharchula Nagar Palika (municipality) was 7,039 (3,797 males and 3,242 females), with a female sex ratio of 854 compared to the state average of 963. Children of 0–6 years represent 12.64% of the population with a child sex ratio of 824 compared to the Uttarakhand state average of 890. The literacy rate of Dharchula city is 88.68%, higher than the state average of 78.82%; literacy in males is around 95.10% and in females, it stands at 81.20%.

The primary religion in Dharchula is Hinduism (46.5%) & Buddhism (45.5%), followed by Islam (7.61%), Christianity (0.67%) and Sikhism (0.17%).

Dharchula is mainly inhabited by the Bhotiya tribe which has a unique cultural heritage. Rung Kalyan Sanstha is an institution which binds together the entire Rung community. Dharchula has the Rung Community School.
The migrating villages, during winters would come down from the villages in the hills of the 3 valleys viz. Darma, Chaundas and Byans.

Geography 
The town is situated in a valley at 940 m elevation and is 92 km from its district headquarters, Pithoragarh. The road from Pithoragarh to Dharchula is alongside the Kali River and the journey takes 3 to 4 hours. State government bus and private jeep are available. However, reaching Pithoragarh itself from the plains is a tiring journey. One can reach Pithoragarh from either Haldwani railway station in about eight hours or from Tanakpur railway station in about six hours (both towns situated on the foothills of Himalayas in the Uttarakhand state) in about eight hours. Generally the private jeeps and buses run from Haldwani only till around 11 a.m. as it is quite dangerous to drive at night in the hilly tracks. The road is quite good and there are many good Dhabas (small eateries) midway. However, the landslides in the rainy season (July–September) make the travel a bit dangerous and inconvenient. The roads have many curves and can create nausea but the journey to the town provides the travellers the magnificent sightseeing opportunity of the grand Himalayan peaks.

Dharchula has been a major trading centre for the trans-Himalayan trade routes. Dharchula is rather cluttered these days because of narrow roads which cannot be widened, without proper parking or a bus station. 

On the Darma trail, one gets to see the snow-clad Panchachuli peaks whose base is located at the villages of Dantu and Dugtu. Panchachuli separates the Rung people from the Johar valley and the Om Parvat is on the Byans valley. 

Dharchula has a KMVN (Kumaon Mandal Vikas Nigam) rest house. Dharchula is the base camp for the Kailash Manasarover Yatra and Aadi Kailash Yatra. Situated on the bank of the river Kali, Dharchula has the unique distinction of having a marine drive along the Kalli river.

History 
Dharchula was an ancient trading town on the Trans-Himalayan trade routes. Trade was based on barter system and was the only source of income for the inhabitants of Dharchula. Local handicrafts like carpets which are known here as ‘dan’, were exchanged with the Tibetans for food and clothing.

After the Indo-China War in 1962, all trading ties with the Tibetans came to a stop which caused innumerable hardships to the people of Dharchula. The difficulty forced people to look for alternate means of earnings. Soon the locals engaged themselves in farming, small businesses and cattle farming. With government intervention, good tourism facilities have developed in the town.

Climate 
Summers are warm and shiny but the winters are cold. The higher altitude regions of Dharchula (basically upper valleys) receive snow during the winter season (December to February end). The area also receives heavy rainfall during the rainy season (July–September) which disrupts the normal course of life of the people and often causes landslides in the mountain areas.

The entire town during winters has snow-capped hills around the valley. Snow melt streams flow down to the river. Though the exact record of when did it snow in the past is not known but in the year 2006 it snowed in the town and the entire town was under the cover of snow. There is a warm water spring called "doom pani". There is also a hot spring (a sulfur spring) at Tapovan.

People 
The town is dominated by the Bhotiya tribe including it’s two major sub-tribes called Rung and Shauka people, the two words often being used as synonyms. They have flat features and are of short height. The people are quite hospitable, and simple in their living. These people have been living in the surrounding mountains of Dharchula valley since ages. In early times, people used to live in surrounding hills during the summer season and hibernate to the green valley of Dharchula in winters to beat the extremely cold weather at the high altitudes. Gradually the people started getting used to live in the relatively warmer climate of the valley and that's how the place became a permanent ground for the people once hibernating there. Tents and wooden houses soon changed into houses of brick and mortar. What started as a small stop over place in the early 1900s had developed to a full grown town by the 1990s. The town not only provides a permanent shelter to the regional people, but also a resting place to traders and pilgrims who cross the town in order to reach their destinations far ahead. This growing crowd was a start of the trend which lay the foundation of Dharchula's commercialization. With passing time, people from different parts of the plains and foothill areas started settling in Dharchula to tap the commercial opportunities of the area. Although the majority of the population in Dharchula still consists of Rung people, there are other sects of people too, such as the Punjabis, Baniyas, and others.

Lifeline of the people 
In earlier times, the entire population was dependent on trade with the Tibetans. Goods from India like handmade carpets (better known as 'Dan' locally) and spices were traded in exchange for clothes, eatables, etc. Soon after the Indo-Sino war of 1962, all trade relations with Tibet were snapped. The war broke the lifeline of the place - trade, the only means of earning for the Dharchula residents. This difficult time forced the people to look for alternate means of earnings. Soon the local population engaged themselves in farming (terrace farming), small businesses and cattle farming. Catering to the tourism requirements is still an unexploited opportunity the youth population is looking forward to fulfill. However, it is only after the government's intervention and help that good tourism facilities can develop in the town and surrounding areas, thus creating an employment opportunity for many. Today, after the increased awareness about the job opportunities available beyond Dharchula and the surrounding hilly towns, the local people are venturing into government jobs and businesses all over the country, and also overseas.

Very recently, a new earning opportunity has been found in the form of a fungus, colloquially known as caterpillar fungus. The fungus is known in Tibetan as Yarsagumba. Caterpillar fungi are the result of a parasitic relationship between the fungus and the larva of the ghost moth genus Thitarodes, several species of which live on the Himalayas in India and Nepal. The fungus germinates in living organisms, kills and mummifies the insect, and then the fungus grows from the body of the insect.

The hand-collected fungus-caterpillar combination is valued by herbalists and as a status symbol. It is used as an aphrodisiac and treatment for ailments such as fatigue and cancer, although such use is mainly based on traditional Chinese medicine, anecdote, and a limited amount of research. Clinical trials have not established its efficacy.

The fungus was known as Cordyceps until 2007, when molecular analysis was used to amend the classification of the Cordycipitaceae and the Clavicipitaceae, resulting in the naming of a new family – Ophiocordycipitaceae – and the transfer of several Cordyceps species to Ophiocordyceps. Though it has not been legalised, this caterpillar harvesting has provided earning opportunities to many youth. During the harvesting season, manual labourers are hard to find because they all move to the hills along with their families and camp at the site for several days. Selling it is not difficult – there are buyers who even come from across the border to buy it.

Language and culture 
The Rung community speaks RungLo which falls under Tibetic language family . Runglo has no writing system or script. Apart than RungLo, the local population is quite well versed in Hindi, Nepali and English.

The Rung Community celebrate all of their festivals and important occasions with great zeal and enthusiasm. The celebrations are marked with the presence of dance, baira(songs) and sathani (a locally prepared wine).

There traditional wear, which is addressed as Chungbala and Ranga. Byanthalo or Shilye (the white turban) is also a part of the men's wear. Big silver necklaces, nose and ear rings constitute the jewellery of women here. The use of the traditional wear is nowadays restricted to only important occasions and big celebrations.  However, it is far from reality to simply assume that the people here are not fashion aware due to the geographical isolation. Everything from Ghagras to Lehngas and Levis jeans to torn jeans can be seen in the streets here, thanks to the growing commercialization and the small Moti Bazaar (market) of Nepal. Dharchula will soon have a well-stocked community library. A small sports stadium is already functional. The pride of Dharchula is going to be the Rung Cultural Museum which will house the living cultural symbols of this community.

Flora and fauna
The climatic conditions and the low human interference till date has allowed the green vegetation of this region to thrive. Trees of oak, pine, apple and deodar can be easily seen here. However, with the increasing global warming, the trees here are now bearing lesser and lesser of fruits year after year.

Wild animals such as leopard, bear, fox, monkeys and deer are found in this region. Apart from these, domestic animals such as horses, mules and sheep are also found here.

Dharchula Military Station
Dharchula is a permanent military station of Indian Army. "The Kumaon Scouts", the scout battalion of Kumaon Regiment, are stationed at this military station. It is a very important military station because it is located in a remote location and is situated near the border of India, Tibet and Nepal.

Must Visit Tourist Destinations 

Dharchula Gumba: Dharchula Gumba is located close to the Kailash  Mansarovar National Highway National Highway 9 in the Dharchula City.  Dharchula Gumba is a holy pilgrimage site for both Hindus and Buddhists.
It's a very holy Buddhist Cave Temple having mantras and holy symbols carved on the walls of the holy cave dating back to the 8th Century.

Main Dharma Protector of Dharchula Gumba is Mahakala.

During 876 AD Guru Padmasambhava meditated in this cave and left his footprints as a blessings. Followed by his pilgrimage to Kailash where he completed his final 7 Days retreat in the cave of Chhu Gumba.

Having very strong meditation energy fields inside the cave. This cave is one of the very few well preserved Buddhist historical sites in Uttarakhand having inscriptions carved on its rock wall.

Not taking blessings from Bhairava of Kailash before pilgrimage is considered incomplete, 
Kailash Mansarovar pilgrims make prayer to Mahakala in this temple and receive the holy white scaff from this temple which they are supposed to offer it in Kailash in order to seek his protection and blessings without this Kailash Yatra is considered incomplete as Mahakala is the main Bhairava of Kailash bhumi.

Narayan Ashram: Narayan Ashram is situated at an elevation of 2734 m. above sea level.  It can be reached from Pithoragarh via Ogla (44 km from Pithoragarh), Jauljibi (77 km), Dharchula (94 km), Tawaghat (108 km). Jauljibi is the place where Dhauliganga and Kaliganga meet.The ashram was established by Sri Narayan Swami in 1936. It can accommodate maximum 40 persons at a time. During winter season the ashram remains closed due to heavy snowfall. And rainy season may cause damage to the road.

Kali River: The Kali River originates from the Greater Himalayas at Kalapaani at an altitude of 3,600 m, in the Pithoragarh District of Uttarakhand, India. The river is named after the Goddess Kali whose temple is situated in Kalapaani near the Lipu-Lekh pass at the border between India and Tibet. On its upper course, this river forms India's continuous eastern boundary with Nepal.

Dhauliganga Dam: Uttarakhand is a land of rivers and mountains and thus holds a lot of potential for hydro electric power generation. A similar such initiative has resulted in the creation of the Chirkila dam on river Kali at Chirkila, a place 20 km ahead of Dharchula. The dam has a capacity of producing 280 MW of power. The dam is adjoined by a lake stretching up to 1 km in length.

Om Parwat:

The 'Om Parvat' is closer to the Lipulekh Pass near Nabi Dangh...on the way to Tibet... its snow deposition pattern gives the impression of the Hindu sacred syllable 'AUM' (ॐ) written on it. This majestic letter ॐ clearly stands out when the snow starts melting at the end of the winter season. 

Adi Kailash or Jowolingkhang

( Adi Kailash or Jowolingkhang Peak also known as Chhota Kailash is an ancient holy mountain for both Hindus and Buddhist in the Himalayan mountain range, lying in the Tehsil Dharchula, Pithoragarh district of Uttarakhand, India, near Sinla pass. Its appearance is distinctly similar to Mount Kailash in Tibet.  
Parvati Lake, like Lake Mansarovar, is considered sacred. Just opposite to the peak of Adi Kailash, lies the mountain Parwati Mukut (Parvati's Crown).

India-Nepal and India-Tibet border: The town is a sensitive area as it shares its borders with both Nepal and China. However, the area has always remained peaceful place and an excellent example of good inter-cultural ties between the nations.

References

External links 
 
 Dharchula at wikimapia.

Hill stations in Uttarakhand
Cities and towns in Pithoragarh district
Transit and customs posts along the India–Nepal border